Cancrinia is a genus of flowering plants in the aster family, Asteraceae. They are native to central Asia, where they are distributed in China, Mongolia, and Russia.

These are compact, woolly-haired perennial herbs and subshrubs. The leaves are alternately arranged or clustered, sometimes densely. Flower heads are solitary at the tips of the stems or arranged in inflorescences. The hemispherical or cup-shaped head is lined with 3 or 4 rows of phyllaries that sometimes have dark margins. It contains tubular yellow disc florets. The fruit is an achene tipped with lance-shaped scales like a pappus.

Cancrinia discoidea is used as a medicinal remedy for inflammation and other conditions.

 Species
 Cancrinia angrenica - Tajikistan
 Cancrinia chrysocephala - Altay, Kazakhstan, Xinjiang
 Cancrinia discoidea  - Altay, Irkutsk, Uzbekistan, Kazakhstan, Tibet, Gansu, Xingiang, Mongolia
 Cancrinia karataviensis - Kazakhstan, Tajikistan, Kyrgyzstan
 Cancrinia krasnoborovii - Siberia 
 Cancrinia lasiocarpa - Gansu, Mongolia, Ningxia
 Cancrinia litwinowii - Xinjiang
 Cancrinia maximowiczi - Gansu, Xingiang, Mongolia, Qinghai
 Cancrinia pamirica - Tajikistan
 Cancrinia rupestris - Turkmenistan
 Cancrinia tianschanica - Altay, Kazakhstan, Xinjiang, Uzbekistan, Kyrgyzstan
 Cancrinia tripinnatifida - West Himalaya

References

Asteraceae genera
Anthemideae